ALshgb is a village in the Republic of Yemen, within the Mawiyah District of the Taiz Governorate. Its population was 1,391 in 2004.

Villages in Yemen
Taiz Governorate